This is a list of Indians in Sri Lanka. The list includes notable people from multiple different ethnicities, as well as people native to India who are living in or notable in Sri Lanka.

Indian Tamils

 Mano Ganesan - prominent human rights activist; politician
 K. Natesa Iyer - pre-independence politician
 Muthiah Muralidaran – Sri Lanka international spin bowler; world record holder for most wickets taken in Test cricket
 M.G. Ramachandran - Sri Lankan-born Indian politician and actor
 Arumugan Thondaman - Sri Lankan politician
 Savumiamoorthy Thondaman - post-independence politician

Colombo Chetties
Reggie Candappa - founder Chairman of Grant McCann Erickson
Rohan Candappa - Canadian author
Gritakumar E. Chitty - Sri Lankan First Registrar and Secretary-General of International Tribunal for the Law of the Sea (retired)
Rukmani Devi - actress and singer
Roy Dias - former cricket captain 
Jeyaraj Fernandopulle - Sri Lankan politician
Neela Marikkar - Chairperson of Grant McCann Erickson
Christopher Ondaatje - OC, CBE, Sri Lankan-Canadian businessman, philanthropist, adventurer, writer and Olympian
Michael Ondaatje - OC, Sri Lankan Canadian novelist and poet, perhaps best known for his Booker Prize winning novel adapted into an Academy Award-winning film, The English Patient

Others
 Mahesh Amalean 
 Nirj Deva

Usurpers of the Sri Lankan throne
 Ellalan
 The Five Dravidians
 Kalinga Magha
 Parakrama Pandya
 Sena and Guttika
 The Six Dravidians

Indian dynasty of the Kingdom of Kandy
 Nayaks of Kandy

See also
 List of Sri Lankans by ethnicity

References

I
Indian diaspora by country
Indians in Sri Lanka
Sri Lanka
Indian